Roberto Trotta (born 28 January 1969 in Pigüé) is an Argentine football manager and former defender.

Trotta played club football in Argentina, Spain, Italy, Mexico and Ecuador. During his time in the Argentine Primera he set the record for the highest number of red cards ever with 17.

Trotta was a member of several championship winning teams, the highlight of his career was helping Vélez Sársfield to win the 1994 Copa Libertadores.

Trotta has worked as a manager, including a spell as manager of Almagro in 2007.

Titles

Vélez Sársfield
 Torneo Apertura: 1995
 Torneo Clausura: 1993
 Copa Libertadores: 1994
 Intercontinental Cup: 1994
 Copa Interamericana: 1994

River Plate
 Torneo Apertura: 1999
 Torneo Clausura: 2000

External links
 Argentine Primera statistics
 

1969 births
Living people
Sportspeople from Buenos Aires Province
Argentine footballers
Argentina international footballers
Association football defenders
Argentine Primera División players
Estudiantes de La Plata footballers
Club Atlético Vélez Sarsfield footballers
Racing Club de Avellaneda footballers
Club Atlético River Plate footballers
Unión de Santa Fe footballers
Club Puebla players
Expatriate footballers in Mexico
Argentine expatriate sportspeople in Mexico
Atlante F.C. footballers
A.S. Roma players
Expatriate footballers in Italy
Sporting de Gijón players
Expatriate footballers in Spain
Barcelona S.C. footballers
Expatriate footballers in Ecuador
Serie A players
Argentine football managers
Almagro managers
Independiente Rivadavia managers
Argentine expatriate footballers
Argentine expatriate sportspeople in Spain